Nanorrhinum is a genus of flowering plant in family Plantaginaceae.

Species
, Plants of the World Online accepted the following species:

Nanorrhinum acerbianum (Boiss.) Betsche
Nanorrhinum asparagoides (Schweinf.) Ghebr.
Nanorrhinum azraqense (Boulos & Lahham) Ghebr.
Nanorrhinum baluchestanicum Naanaie, Assadi & Tavassoli
Nanorrhinum bentii (Skan) Betsche
Nanorrhinum cabulicum (Benth.) Podlech & Iranshahr
Nanorrhinum campyloceras (Rech.f. & Esfand.) Naanaie, Assadi & Tavassoli
Nanorrhinum chasmophyticum (Wendelbo) Naanaie, Assadi & Tavassoli
Nanorrhinum dichondrifolium (Benth.) Betsche
Nanorrhinum elegans (G.Forst.) Ghebr.
Nanorrhinum hastatum (R.Br. ex Benth.) Ghebr.
Nanorrhinum heterophyllum (Schousb.) Ghebr.
Nanorrhinum incanum (Wall.) Betsche
Nanorrhinum judaicum (Danin) Yousefi & Zarre
Nanorrhinum khuzestanicum Naanaie, Assadi & Tavassoli
Nanorrhinum kuriense (Radcl.-Sm.) Ghebr.
Nanorrhinum macilentum (Decne.) Betsche
Nanorrhinum monodianum (Maire) Ibn Tattou
Nanorrhinum ovatum (Benth.) Podlech & Iranshahr
Nanorrhinum petranum (Danin) Yousefi & Zarre
Nanorrhinum ramosissimum (Wall.) Betsche
Nanorrhinum roseiflorum Mosti, Raffaelli & Tardelli
Nanorrhinum sagittatum (Poir.) Yousefi & Zarre
Nanorrhinum scariosepalum (Täckh. & Boulos) Yousefi & Zarre
Nanorrhinum scoparium (Brouss. ex Spreng.) Yousefi & Zarre
Nanorrhinum stenanthum (Franch.) Ghebr.
Nanorrhinum urbanii (Pit.) Yousefi & Zarre
Nanorrhinum webbianum (J.A.Schmidt) Betsche
Nanorrhinum woodii (D.A.Sutton) Ghebr.

References

 
Plantaginaceae genera
Taxonomy articles created by Polbot